Richard Hudson Bryan (born July 16, 1937) is an American attorney and politician who served as a United States Senator from Nevada from 1989 to 2001. A Democrat, Bryan served as the 25th Governor of Nevada from 1983 to 1989, and before that served as the state's attorney general and a member of the State Senate.

Early life
Bryan was born in Washington, D.C., and graduated from the University of Nevada at Reno in 1959 where he was a member of Alpha Tau Omega and the president of ASUN. He earned his J.D. degree from the University of California, Hastings College of the Law. In 1963 he was admitted to the Nevada Bar. He was Clark County's first public defender.

Political career

Bryan served as a member of the Nevada Senate from 1972 to 1978. In 1979, Bryan became the Nevada Attorney General, and served in the position until 1983. Bryan was the Governor of Nevada from 1983 to 1989.

Bryan successfully ran for the U.S. Senate, serving from 1989 to 2001. During his tenure in the Senate, Bryan served on the Finance, Banking, Intelligence and Commerce Committees. He opted not to run for re-election in 2000.

Bryan was an opponent of Search for extraterrestrial intelligence (SETI), stating: "As of today millions have been spent and we have yet to bag a single little green fellow. Not a single Martian has said take me to your leader, and not a single flying saucer has applied for FAA approval." He introduced an amendment to the 1994 budget that secured the cancellation of the High Resolution Microwave Survey and terminated NASA's SETI efforts less than one year after their launch.

Bryan also focused on preventing Yucca Mountain from being used as a nuclear waste long-term storage site. Though the Yucca Mountain nuclear waste repository would be built during Bryan's time in the Senate, his opposition, along with delayed any actual storage from occurring. This opposition would continue after Bryan had retired before plans for storage were discontinued by President Barack Obama.

References

External links

 
 A Guide to the U.S. Senatorial Papers of Richard H. Bryan, Special Collections, University Libraries, University of Nevada, Reno.
 How Richard Bryan destroyed the NASA's SETI project
 Richard H Bryan's current professional page
 

1937 births
Living people
Democratic Party governors of Nevada
Democratic Party United States senators from Nevada
Lawyers from Washington, D.C.
Nevada Attorneys General
Democratic Party Nevada state senators
Politicians from Carson City, Nevada
Politicians from Las Vegas
Search for extraterrestrial intelligence
University of California, Hastings College of the Law alumni
University of Nevada, Reno alumni
Public defenders
Members of Congress who became lobbyists